Arthroleptis adolfifriederici is a species of frog in the family Arthroleptidae. It is found in the eastern  Democratic Republic of the Congo, Rwanda, Burundi, and Uganda. Several common names have been coined for it, including Rugege Forest squeaker, Rugegewald squeaker, Adolf Friedrich's squeaker frog, and Adolf's squeaker.

Etymology
The specific name adolfifriederici is named for Duke Adolf Friedrich of Mecklenburg, German explorer and colonial politician, based on the "stately form" of the species.

Description
Arthroleptis adolfifriederici is a moderately robust frog with long, slender limbs. Males measure  (two specimens only) and females  in snout–vent length. The head is broad. The tympanum is distinct and circular, tending toward ovoid. The fingers and toes do not have webbing but the toes have prominent subarticular tubercles. Skin is generally glandular. Color in preservative (alcohol) is light to medium brown with small, dark-brown spots.

Habitat and conservation
It has also been recorded at the edge of human-modified forests following land clearance for agriculture. It appears to be an uncommon species. It is threatened by forest loss due to agriculture, timber cutting, and human settlements. It occurs in many protected areas, including the Nyungwe Forest National Park in Rwanda and Bwindi Impenetrable Forest in Uganda.

References

adolfifriederici
Frogs of Africa
Amphibians of Burundi
Amphibians of the Democratic Republic of the Congo
Amphibians of Rwanda
Amphibians of Uganda
Taxa named by Fritz Nieden
Amphibians described in 1911
Taxonomy articles created by Polbot